The Rue Oudinot is a street in the 7th arrondissement of Paris, France. It was named for Nicolas-Charles Oudinot. The defunct Ministry of the French Colonial Empire was located on the street.

References